Casey John Hankinson (born May 8, 1976) is an American former professional ice hockey player who most notably played in the American Hockey League for the Norfolk Admirals and also played 18 games in the National Hockey League for the Chicago Blackhawks and the Mighty Ducks of Anaheim, in a career that lasted from 1998 to 2005. Internationally Hankinson represented the American national team at the 1996 World Junior Championships..

Hockey career
Hankinson was drafted 201st overall by the Blackhawks in the 1995 NHL Entry Draft from the University of Minnesota.  He became an offensive standout for Chicago's AHL affiliate the Norfolk Admirals, eventually playing 14 games for the Blackhawks. In 2003, he moved to Anaheim where he played just 4 more games in the NHL, spending much of his Ducks career in their AHL franchise the Cincinnati Mighty Ducks. After a brief spell in Switzerland and another season in Cincinnati, Hankinson retired and now is an Executive Vice President at Ryan Companies.

Personal life
Hankinson is married to Holli and the couple have three children.

In 1994, Hankinson was inducted into the Edina Athletic Hall of Fame. His father, John, and his two brothers were also inducted into the Hall of Fame.

Career statistics

Regular season and playoffs

International

References

External links

1976 births
Living people
American men's ice hockey right wingers
Anaheim Ducks scouts
Chicago Blackhawks draft picks
Chicago Blackhawks players
Cincinnati Mighty Ducks players
Cleveland Lumberjacks players
HC La Chaux-de-Fonds players
Ice hockey players from Minnesota
Mighty Ducks of Anaheim players
Minnesota Golden Gophers men's ice hockey players
Norfolk Admirals players
Portland Pirates players
Sportspeople from Edina, Minnesota
Edina High School alumni